HIP 14810 is a star with three exoplanetary companions in the northern constellation of Aries. It positioned about 1.3° to the north of Delta Arietis, but is too faint to be visible to the naked eye with an apparent visual magnitude of 8.6. The system is located at a distance of 165 light-years from the Sun based on parallax measurements, but is drifting closer with a radial velocity of −5 km/s.

This is an ordinary G-type main-sequence star with a stellar classification of G6V. It has a relatively low activity level and a low projected rotational velocity of 0.5 km/s, which indicates it is an old star with an age of around eight billion years. The star has a high metallicity with a mass and luminosity about the same as the Sun.

Planetary system
Orbiting the star are three confirmed planets. The discovery paper for HIP 14810 b and HIP 14810 c was published in 2007, while that for HIP 14810 d was published in 2009, together with a revision for the orbital parameters for planet c. Simulations suggest that the orbits of these planets do not allow a stable orbit for a hypothetical super-earth in the habitable zone.

See also
 Lists of exoplanets

References

External links
 Extrasolar Planet Interactions by Rory Barnes & Richard Greenberg, Lunar and Planetary Lab, University of Arizona
 Image HIP 14810

G-type main-sequence stars
Planetary systems with three confirmed planets
Aries (constellation)
Durchmusterung objects
014810